Bolandra is a small genus of plants related to the saxifrages. It contains two species known as false coolworts. These are perennials with toothed leaves and inflorescences of curling, sharp-petalled flowers. They are both native to western North America.

Species:
Bolandra californica - Sierra false coolwort
Bolandra oregana - northern false coolwort

External links
Jepson Manual Treatment

Saxifragaceae
Saxifragaceae genera